Shaqāʾiq al-Utrunj fī Raqāʾiq al-Ghunj is a manuscript allegedly written by Islamic writer Al-Suyuti in the late fourteen century. The book is one of many books dealing with sex written by the author, such as Nawāḍir al-Ayk fī Maʻrifat al-Nayk and Al-Wishāḥ fī Fawāʾid al-Nikāḥ.

The book was published for the first time in 1988 by Syrian publisher Dār al-Maʻrifah.

References 

Arabic erotic literature
14th-century Arabic books
Medieval Arabic literature
Books by al-Suyuti
Islamic sexual education literature
Arabic sex manuals